Mark L. Smith is an American screenwriter.

Career
He wrote and directed the 2006 film Séance, which won the Festival Prize at the Eureka Springs Digital Film Festival and the Horror Genre Award at ShockFest. Since then he has worked as a screenwriter. Smith's writing credits include the 2007 horror film Vacancy and its prequel, Vacancy 2: The First Cut, and the 2009 Joe Dante film The Hole. Together with Alejandro González Iñárritu, he co-wrote The Revenant, based in part on the novel of the same name by Michael Punke. The film stars Leonardo DiCaprio, Tom Hardy and Will Poulter. Shooting began in September 2014. The film was released on December 25, 2015.

Smith was hired by Paramount to write the script for the fourth film in the rebooted Star Trek series in December 2017.

Filmography
Film

Special thanks
 The Hitman's Bodyguard (2017)
 In the Dark of the Valley (2021) (Documentary)

References

External links

Living people
American film directors
American male screenwriters
Year of birth missing (living people)